Ashley Craig Kelly (born 22 December 1988) is an English football midfielder.

He started his career at Oldham Athletic having loan spells with Barrow and Leigh RMI, before moving to Salford City, Curzon Ashton and Chester.

Career

Oldham Athletic
Born in Ashton-under-Lyne, Kelly was given a full-time contract with Oldham Athletic in Summer 2007, having successfully played as a youth and reserve player at the club. In October 2007, he joined Leigh RMI on loan for one month, making a solitary appearance against Blyth Spartans. He later signed for Barrow on loan in December 2007, though never made an appearance.

Kelly's first senior squad appearance for Oldham Athletic came on 12 April 2008 in a 2–0 win over Leyton Orient. In April 2008, both Kelly and teammate Mike Pearson were told that they were to be released at the end of their contracts.

Into Non-league
After his release from 'the Latics', he has a short spell at Salford City, before moving to Curzon Ashton.

He then joined Conference North side Hyde F.C. in December 2011. In the summer of 2012 he joined Northwich Victoria but left the club within the first few months of the season.

As of 2016, Kelly does not currently play for any football team.

References

External links
 Ashley Kelly career stats at OldhamAthletic.co.uk
 

1988 births
Living people
Footballers from Ashton-under-Lyne
English footballers
Association football midfielders
Oldham Athletic A.F.C. players
Leigh Genesis F.C. players
Barrow A.F.C. players
Salford City F.C. players
Curzon Ashton F.C. players
Hyde United F.C. players
Northwich Victoria F.C. players
English Football League players